Platynus cincticollis is a species of ground beetle in the family Carabidae. It has two reddish spots on the head, and is found in North America.

References

Further reading

 

Platynus
Articles created by Qbugbot
Beetles described in 1823